Risoba calainodes is a species of moth of the family Nolidae first described by Alice Ellen Prout in 1928. It is found in Sumatra.

References

External links
Original description: Prout, A. E. (1928). "Descriptions of some Indo-Australian Noctuidae". Bulletin of the Hill Museum. 2: 167.

Nolidae
Moths of Sumatra
Moths described in 1928